Sebastian Arocha Morton is a Grammy-nominated American record producer and composer based in Los Angeles, California. Throughout his career as a record producer and songwriter, Morton has worked with many notable artists, including Seal, Sting, Santana, Donna Summer, Fischerspooner, Vikter Duplaix, Common, and Mary J. Blige. Morton was also a composer and producer for the films Little Miss Sunshine, Iron Man 2, Houdini (miniseries), Robocop, SpongeBob, League of Gods, Mr. Robot, and Young Sheldon.

Morton composes and fuses a wide variety of musical genres, ranging from dance to hip hop, soul and ambient, among various other genres. His approach to film scoring bridges the worlds of modern electronic production and more traditional melodic orchestral composing.

Education and career

Morton graduated from the Berklee College of Music in Boston, where he studied film scoring and production/engineering. Afterwards, he moved to Los Angeles, California to pursue a career in the film and music industries as a staff writer for Universal Music.

Morton then began producing electronic music in the early 2000s under the artist name ROCAsound. After several Billboard #1 singles and platinum albums, he started his own production company and opened a recording facility under the same name. As ROCAsound, he has remixed and produced tracks for the soundtrack to Iron Man 2, as well as songs and remixes for Donna Summer, Sting, Chaka Khan, Seal, The Dandy Warhols, Counting Crows, Jody Watley, The Killers, Kaskade, Ricky Martin, Yuridia, and Fischerspooner, among various other artists.

After much success as ROCAsound, Morton discovered and signed Billboard #1 electronic artist Samantha James, and went on to write and produce the albums Subconscious and Rise for San Francisco label OM Records. Morton later worked on Donna Summer's final studio album  Crayons,
where he was credited among producers such as Greg Kurstin and J.R. Rotem. The first single for that record, "I'm a Fire" (produced and co-written by Morton), went to #1 on the charts and set a record for her as the only female artist in history with a #1 Billboard dance hit in every decade since the 1970s. Also, as a songwriter, Morton has worked closely with hit writers Claudia Brant and Bruce Sudano.

Other collaborations include:
"One of These Days" (with Santana and Ozomatli)
"Never Coming Home" for the Queer Eye for the Straight Guy soundtrack (with Sting)
"Not in Love" (with Enrique Iglesias and Floetry)
"Scent of Magnolia" (with David Sylvian and Ryuichi Sakamoto)
Alex Cross (film collaboration with composer John Debney)
Disney Parks: World of Color and Iron Man Experience (collaboration with composer John Debney)
"Whenever I Say Your Name" (BBC Radio version) with Sting feat. Mary J. Blige
"Superfreak" (ROCAsound Revamp) with Rick James

Discography

Filmography
Some of the most notable films and television series for which Morton has been a composer and sound producer:

2006: Little Miss Sunshine
2010: Iron Man 2
2014: Draft Day
2014: Houdini (miniseries)
2014: Robocop
2015: SpongeBob: Sponge Out of Water
2016: League of Gods
2016: Mr. Robot
2017: Young Sheldon
2018: Madden 19: Longshot 2 Homecoming
2019: The Orville

Full list of Film and TV credits:

Selected awards
Some of Morton's Grammy Award nominations include:

2006 Grammy nominee: Little Miss Sunshine (Best Compilation Soundtrack Album for Motion Picture, Television or Other Visual Media)
2007 Grammy nominee (with Vikter Duplaix): "Make A Baby" (Best Urban/Alternative Category)

Billboard #1 Singles and Albums include:
2004 Billboard Electronic Albums Chart: Queer Eye for the Straight Guy soundtrack (Never Coming Home feat. Sting)
2005 Dance Singles Chart: Jody Watley - "Looking for a New Love" (remixes)
2007 Dance Singles Chart: Samantha James - "Rise"
2008 Dance Singles Chart: Donna Summer - "I'm a Fire"
2009 Latin Albums Chart: Luis Miguel - No Culpes a La Noche

References

External links
ROCAsound official website
Discogs profile
Instagram profile
AllMusic profile

Living people
Year of birth missing (living people)
American film score composers
Berklee College of Music alumni
Record producers from Los Angeles